The R677 road is a regional road in County Waterford, Ireland. It travels from the R676 road to the R675, via the villages of Kilmacthomas and Ballylaneen.

References

Regional roads in the Republic of Ireland
Roads in County Waterford